The men's canoe sprint K-1 200 metres at the 2016 Olympic Games in Rio de Janeiro took place between 19 and 20 August at Lagoa Stadium. The medals were presented by José Perurena López, IOC member, Spain and Frank Garner, Board Member of the ICF.

Competition format
The competition comprised heats, semifinals, and a final round. The leading five in each heat plus the fastest sixth place advanced to the semifinals. The top four from the semifinals advanced to the "A" final, and competed for medals. The other semifinalists advanced to the "B" final.

Schedule
All times are Brasilia Time (UTC-03:00)

Results

Heats

Heat 1

Heat 2

Heat 3

Semifinals

Semifinal 1

Semifinal 2

Finals

Final B

Final A

References

Canoeing at the 2016 Summer Olympics
Men's events at the 2016 Summer Olympics